Aspas Rural District is a rural district (dehestan) in Sedeh District, Eqlid County, Fars Province, Iran. At the 2006 census, its population was 4,116, in 922 families.  The rural district has 7 villages.

References 

Rural Districts of Fars Province
Eqlid County